Historisch-kritisches Wörterbuch des Marxismus (HKWM) (in English: Historical-Critical Dictionary of Marxism) is a major international German-language encyclopedia of Marxism. It is published by the Berlin Institute of Critical Theory (InkriT), Germany. The editor-in-chief is Wolfgang Fritz Haug. The work is planned to be published in 15 volumes. The first volume was published in 1994; in 2015 was vol. 8/II published and in March 2018 Band 9/I is to be published. The work is also available in electronic form and each article may be ordered separately as a pdf-file for immediately delivery.

Publishing plan
 Vol. 1: Abbau des Staates – Avantgarde (1994)
 Vol. 2: Bank –  Dummheit in der Musik (1995)
 Vol. 3: Ebene –  Extremismus (1997)
 Vol. 4: Fabel – Gegenmacht (1999)
 Vol. 5: Gegenöffentlichkeit – Hegemonialapparat (2001)
 Vol. 6/I: Hegemonie – Imperialismus (2004)
 Vol. 6/II: Imperium – Justiz (2004)
 Vol. 7/I: Kaderpartei – Klonen (2008)
 Vol. 7/II: Knechtschaft – Krise des Marxismus (2010)
 Vol. 8/I: Krisentheorie – Linie Luxemburg/Gramsci (2012)
 Vol. 8/II: links/rechts – Maschinenstürmer (2015)
 Vol. 9/I: Maschinerie bis Mitbestimmung (March 2018)
 Vol. 9/II: Mitleid – naturwüchsig
 Band 10: Negation der Negation – Phantasie
 Band 11: Philosophie – Regulationsthoerie
 Band 12: Reichtum – Sorelismus
 Band 13: Sowjet – Text
 Band 14: Theater – verstehen/erklären
 Band 15: Versuch – Zynismus

See also
Critical theory

External links
 English entries: https://web.archive.org/web/20120425225853/http://www.inkrit.org/hkwm-int/index-EN.htm

Marxist theory
Critical theory
German encyclopedias
German-language encyclopedias
Encyclopedias of philosophy
Specialized encyclopedias